The 2015–16 season was Irish provincial rugby union side Connacht Rugby's fifteenth season competing in the Pro12, and the team's twentieth season as a professional side. It was Pat Lam's third season in charge of the side. Connacht finished the season as league champions after defeating Leinster in the 2016 Pro12 Grand Final, the team's first trophy in its 131-year history.

As well as playing in the Pro12, Connacht competed in the Challenge Cup in Europe, having lost a play-off to enter the Champions Cup. The second-tier side the Connacht Eagles competed in the 2015–16 British and Irish Cup.

Background

Competition schedule
Having finished seventh in the 2014–15 Pro12 Connacht were entered into a play-off to qualify for the 2015–16 Champions Cup, but were beaten by Gloucester after extra time. Following this defeat, Connacht were entered into the Challenge Cup. On 17 June 2015, Connacht were drawn into Pool 1 of the tournament along with French Top 14 side Brive, Newcastle Falcons from the English Premiership and Russian side Enisey-STM, who had entered the tournament through a qualifying competition.

The early stages of the season were interrupted by the 2015 Rugby World Cup leading to a congested fixture list after the tournament ended. Due to this fixture pile up, Connacht were scheduled to play a game each week for 16 straight weeks after the tournament ended.

Personnel changes
The team came into the season without their long-serving forwards coach Dan McFarland, following his move to Glasgow Warriors. McFarland had joined Connacht as a player in 2000, where he retired and moved into coaching with the side. He was replaced in the role by Jimmy Duffy, who had previously worked for the province's academy.

On the playing front, the close season saw the retirement of Michael Swift, the team's former captain who had made a record 269 appearances for the province, 184 of these coming in the league, a competition record. The close season also saw the departure of  centurion Mils Muliaina to Zebre one season after joining Connacht, and the previous season's loan transfers of John Cooney and Quinn Roux made permanent, while lock Mick Kearney re-joined his home province of Leinster with Ben Marshall going in the opposite direction.

Season

Pre-season
Connacht players returned to training for pre-season on 29 June 2015. Robbie Henshaw and Kieran Marmion were not involved, having returned to training with the  squad earlier in the month, ahead of the World Cup in September. Nathan White was later called into the squad, following an injury to Marty Moore. Marmion did not make the final squad for the tournament.

Connacht played three friendlies in the run up to the season. On 7 August they faced French Top 14 side FC Grenoble, coached by former Connacht player Bernard Jackman, and were beaten 19–52 at home. The following week saw another friendly against Top 14 side, with the team travelling to France to face Castres. Connacht were beaten again, this time by a score of 19–5. The side's final pre-season game came on 21 August, when they faced Irish rivals Munster in Thomond Park. Putting out a near full strength side, Connacht won their final warm up game 12–28.

September
The opening game of the season was a home game Pro12 game against the Newport Gwent Dragons, with Connacht winning 29–23. The following week saw the team travel to Scotland to face reigning champions Glasgow Warriors. After being down 23–6 at half-time, Connacht battled back in the second half but were ultimately to 33–32, earning two bonus points for the performance. Following the second round, the league took a two-week break.

October
The competition resumed in October, with Connacht facing Cardiff Blues in Galway, earning a try bonus point with a 36–31 victory. The following week saw the team face Zebre, which yielded another bonus point win. On 26 October, Connacht traveled to the Liberty Stadium to face the Ospreys who had been champions four times in the past. A 16–21 victory saw Connacht win away to the Welsh side for the first time since 2004. On Halloween night, the team hosted Edinburgh at the Sportsgrounds, with a 14–9 victory the result.

November
On 6 November, Connacht faced Benetton Treviso in Galway, winning 33–19 without collecting a try bonus. The league then took a hiatus to allow European competitions, which had been delayed by the World Cup, to take place. Connacht's opening game in the Challenge Cup saw them face Russian side Enisei-STM in Krasnoyarsk. This meant a near 6,000 kilometre trip to the Siberian city, taking nine hours across two flights for the 24 man squad that traveled. The game was played in temperatures below –20 °C, but Connacht ultimately emerged as 14–31 victors, taking all five points in the process. However, after the game Connacht's return home was delayed. A fault was found with the charter plane before takeoff. This meant alternate plans had to be made, and the travelling party was split into three, with the groups arriving back in Ireland via Amsterdam, London and Paris. Having planned to leave on the night of the game, the latest returning players had been delayed by three days, arriving on Tuesday night with a game against French side Brive to come on Saturday. Despite the travel chaos and delayed return, Connacht defeated Brive 21–17 to go top of their pool.

Connacht returned to Pro12 action on 28 November in their first inter-provincial derby of the season, facing Munster in Thomond Park. Having not won at the venue for 29 years, Connacht pulled off a 12–18 upset, their seventh win from the eight league games played. This left the team top of both the league and their European pool going into December.

December
Connacht's first game in December was away to Cardiff Blues, which ended in a 20–16 defeat. On 11 December, Connacht faced the Newcastle Falcons in Galway in the Challenge Cup, winning 25–10. A week later saw the return fixture take place in Kingston Park, with Connacht losing 29–5. This left Connacht top of the pool on 13 points, with Newcastle two points behind. In the final game of 2015 Connacht faced Ulster in Galway on St. Stephen's Day, losing 3–10.

January
Connacht's first game of 2016 took place on New Year's Day, when they traveled to the RDS Arena to take on Leinster, a game which ended in a 13–0 defeat. On 10 January, the team faced Scarlets in Wales, and were beaten 21–19, taking their Pro12 losing streak to four games. The following week saw a return to European competition, with Connacht travelling to France to face Brive in a game they lost 21–18. The following week, they faced Enisei-STM in Galway, winning 47–5 to top the group. The losses to Brive and Newcastle meant that the team qualified for the quarter-finals with the lowest points tally of the group winners, meaning they would be the away team in their quarter-final, being drawn to face Grenoble, the fourth-highest finishing group winner. On 30 January, Connacht faced Scarlets in the Sportsgrounds and won 30–17, their first Pro12 victory since November.

February
There was no game in the first week of February due to the beginning of the Six Nations Championship. On 11 February, Connacht faced Newport Gwent Dragons in Rodney Parade, beating them 21–26 and earning a try bonus point to go back to the top of the table. The following week saw the team play Zebre in Italy, a game they won 34–51. In their final game of the month, Connacht faced the Ospreys in the Sportsground, winning 30–22 to extend their lead at the top of the league table.

March
On 4 March, Connacht faced Edinburgh in Murrayfield and won with a bonus point to maintain their position as league leaders. A break for the end of the Six Nations meant that only two games were played in March. In the second game, Connacht faced second-placed Leinster at home in an inter-provincial derby on 26 March, with a 7–6 victory seeing them extend their lead.

April
On 1 April, Connacht faced Ulster in Kingspan Stadium with an 18–10 defeat ending their six-game winning streak in the league. The following week saw a return to European action, with the Challenge Cup quarter-final against Grenoble taking place. Despite scoring four tries, Connacht were on the wrong side of a 33–32 scoreline. The team returned to league action on 16 April with another inter-provincial game, this time against Munster. A bonus point win left the team in second place ahead of Glasgow with two rounds to go. Connacht then traveled to Italy to face bottom side Treviso, but in a shocking upset, the Italians won by a score of 22–21 thanks to a last gasp penalty from Jayden Hayward. However, the losing bonus point was enough to guarantee Connacht a top four finish and a first ever spot in the end-of-year playoffs.

May
On 7 May, Connacht faced Glasgow Warriors in a game that would decide home advantage for the playoff round. Connacht won 14–7 thanks to tries from Bundee Aki and Tiernan O'Halloran, to set up a home semi-final against the same opposition. That semi-final took place on 21 May, with Connacht finishing 16–11 victors to set up a final against Leinster, the province's first final in the professional era.

The final took place on 28 May in Murrayfield. Connacht won the game 20–10, with tries from O'Halloran, Niyi Adeolokun and Matt Healy. Captain and man-of-the-match on the day John Muldoon lifted the trophy, the team's first title in its 131-year history.

Coaching and Management Team
Note: Flags indicate national union as has been defined under WR eligibility rules. Individuals may hold more than one non-WR nationality.

Players

Senior Playing Squad

 Players qualified to play for Ireland on dual nationality or residency grounds*.
 Senior 15's internationally capped players in bold.
 Irish Provinces were limited to 4 non-Irish eligible (NIE) players and 1 non-Irish qualified player (NIQ or "Project Player"). Connacht Rugby was exempted from this under a separate development arrangement.

Academy squad

 year 2
 year 2
 year 1
 year 3
 year 1
 year 3
 year 1
 year 3
 year 3
 year 1
 year 3
 year 2
 year 1
 year 3

 year 1
 year 2
 year 3
 year 2
 year 2
 year 1
 year 1

Preseason transfers

Players in
LK  Ultan Dillane promoted from academy
LK  Quinn Roux from  Leinster
LK  Ben Marshall from  Leinster
FL  Nepia Fox-Matamua from  Auckland
FL  Eoghan Masterson promoted from academy
SH  Caolin Blade promoted from academy
SH  John Cooney from  Leinster
FH  AJ MacGinty from  Life Running Eagles
CE  Api Pewhairangi from  New Zealand Warriors

Players out
HK  Seán Henry retired
LK  Mick Kearney to  Leinster
LK  Michael Swift retired
FL  Willie Faloon to  Ulster
FL  Mata Fifita to  Galway Tribesmen
FH  Miah Nikora to  Petrarca
FB  Shane Layden to  Ireland Sevens
FB  Mils Muliaina to  Zebre

Playing kit
Connacht's official kit supplier for the season was Australian manufacturer BLK sport, in the third year of a four-year agreement to supply apparel for all of Connacht Rugby's representative teams and support staff in 2013. Connacht's main shirt sponsors were Irish sporting retailer Lifestyle Sports. Lifestyle Sports signed a four-season deal with the province, to see their logo feature on the jersey until the end of the 2017–18 season.

Results

Pro12

Regular season

Play-offs

Rugby Challenge Cup

Pool 1

Pool winners and runners-up rankings

Quarter-finals

Notes

References

2015-16
2015–16 Pro12 by team
2015–16 in Irish rugby union